John Sweeney (born October 29, 1965) is an American keynote speaker, author, and owner of the Brave New Workshop Comedy Theatre in Minneapolis, Minnesota.

Career life
In 1997, Sweeney and his wife, Jenni Lilledahl, along with Mark Bergren (who left in 1999) purchased the Brave New Workshop Comedy Theatre from founder Dudley Riggs. The Brave New Workshop is the longest running satirical comedy theater in the United States. As executive producer of the Creative Outreach division, John and his team bridge improv-based theatre skills and behaviors to business in the form of professional keynote speaking, experiential training, custom entertainment, message delivery, event consulting and cultural transformation programs. Sweeney has also partnered with training companies Skillsoft and MediaPartners to create video and online-based training programs, titled Improvisational Leadership and Change and Innovation Through Brainstorming

Sweeney and the Brave New Workshop have written three books. A quote from Sweeney, taken from the book Innovation at the Speed of Laughter: 8 Secrets to World Class Idea Generation, appeared as cup quote #183 in Starbucks "The Way I See It Program.". The quote read: "Improvisers don't look at change as an obstacle; we look at it as fuel. we know that the next great idea lies just on the other side of the change. We are constantly asking ourselves, 'What can I do to incite change?' Well?"

Personal
Sweeney was born in Madison, Wisconsin and spent his early years working on his family's dairy farm. He graduated Edgewood High School in 1984 and then St. Norbert College in De Pere, Wisconsin in 1988. In 2005, Sweeney received the Distinguished Alumni Award in Business from the college.

Sweeney and his wife, Jenni Lilledahl, and family live in Deephaven, Minnesota.

Books
Sweeney, John (2004). Innovation at the Speed of Laughter: 8 Secrets to World-Class Idea Generation. Aerialist Press. . 
Sweeney, John (2005). The Art of the Laugh: A Handbook for Sketch Writers, Actors, and Directors. Aerialist Press. .
Sweeney, John (2007). Return to Civility: A Speed of Laughter Project. Aerialist Press. .
Sweeney, John (2007). Innovation at the Speed of Laughter: 8 Secrets to World-Class Idea Generation. (paperback) Aerialist Press. .

References

Articles
Promiscuous Hostility, Positive Neutrality, Interview with John Sweeney, IdeaConnection, November 8, 2009. By Vern Burkhardt

External links
 Brave New Workshop website
 Innovation at the Speed of Laughter
 Return to Civility Book
 Change and Innovation Through Brainstorming training videos at Media Partners

1965 births
Living people
St. Norbert College alumni
People from Deephaven, Minnesota
People from Madison, Wisconsin